Let's Go (so We Can Get Back): A Memoir of Recording and Discording with Wilco, Etc. is a memoir by American musician and Wilco frontman Jeff Tweedy. It was published on November 13, 2018 by Dutton Books, an imprint of Penguin Publishing Group.

It was released shortly before the release of Warm, Tweedy's first solo album of entirely new material.

Summary
Let's Go is a memoir covering Tweedy's childhood in Belleville, Illinois, his music career with Uncle Tupelo and Wilco, his songwriting process, his family, and his struggles with addiction and depression.

Release
The book reached number six on The New York Times Hardcover Nonfiction best-sellers list.

Reception
The book was well received by critics. It was included in Pitchforks list "The Best Music Books of 2018" and Rolling Stones list "The Best Music Books of 2018".

References

2018 non-fiction books
American memoirs
Music autobiographies
English-language books
Dutton Penguin books